John Hall Wheelock (September 9, 1886 – March 22, 1978) was an American poet. He was a descendant of Eleazar Wheelock, founder of Dartmouth College. 
The son of William Efner Wheelock and Emily Charlotte Hall, John Hall Wheelock was born in Far Rockaway, New York, and brought up in the neighborhood now occupied by Rockefeller Center. He summered in a family home on Long Island's South Fork, which provided inspiration for much of his work.

Wheelock's parents encouraged the reading and memorization of poetry, and told of the time when they had seen the great poet Walt Whitman, when John was a baby.

John Hall Wheelock graduated from Harvard University in 1908, and was class poet. As a student, he was editor-in-chief of The Harvard Monthly, and published his first work, Verses by Two Undergraduates, anonymously with his friend Van Wyck Brooks during their freshman year. In 1910, he began work with Charles Scribner and Sons and by 1947 had risen to the position of senior editor. During his career he worked with such distinguished authors as Thomas Wolfe and James Truslow Adams and is noted for discovering poets May Swenson and James Dickey.

Wheelock's published volume of Collected Works was awarded the Golden Rose by the New England Poetry Society in 1936, as the most distinguished contribution to American poetry of that year. For his work Poems Old and New he received the Ridgely Torrence Memorial Award in 1956, and the Borestone Mountain Poetry Award in 1957. In 1962 he won the Bollingen Prize; in 1965 the Signet Society Medal, Harvard University, for distinguished achievement in the arts. In 1972 he was awarded the Gold Medal by the Poetry Society of America for notable achievement in poetry.

John Hall Wheelock was a member of the American Academy of Arts and Letters, Poetry Society of America (Vice president, 1944-1946), National Institute of Arts and Letters (vice-president), and the Academy of American Poets (chancellor, 1947–71; honorary fellow, 1974-1978). He was an honorary consultant in American letters to the Library of Congress.

In 1940, John Hall Wheelock married Phyllis E. DeKay, the daughter of Charles DeKay, poet and art critic.

Works
 Verses by Two Undergraduates
 
 
 
 
 
 The Bright Doom, Scribner, 1927
 Collected Poems, 1911-1936, Scribner, 1936
 Editor to Author: The Letters of Maxwell E. Perkins, 1950. (editor)
 Poems Old and New, Scribner, 1956
 The Gardner and Other Poems, Scribner, 1961
 What is Poetry?, Scribner, 1963
 Dear Men and Women: New Poems, Scribner, 1966
 By Daylight and in Dream: New and Collected Poems, 1904-1970, Scribner, 1970
 In Love and Song: Poems, Scribner, 1971.
 Nirvana

References

External links
 
 
 
 "Sunday Evening in the Common" by John Hall Wheelock
 A Bibliography of Theodore Roosevelt by John Hall Wheelock

1886 births
1978 deaths
20th-century American poets
Bollingen Prize recipients
Harvard University alumni
Ralph Wheelock family
Members of the American Academy of Arts and Letters